The 1994–95 NBA season was the Nuggets' 19th season in the National Basketball Association, and 28th season as a franchise. The Nuggets had the 13th pick in the 1994 NBA draft, and selected Jalen Rose from the University of Michigan, and signed free agent Dale Ellis during the off-season. Coming off their improbable playoff run, the Nuggets were bitten by the injury bug, losing LaPhonso Ellis for all but the final six games of the season due to a knee injury from an off-season pickup game. Without their star forward, second-year forward Rodney Rogers became the team's starting power forward, while the Nuggets also replaced scoring leader Mahmoud Abdul-Rauf as the team's starting point guard with Robert Pack, as the team won five of their first six games. However, head coach Dan Issel resigned with the team holding an 18–16 record. Under his assistant Gene Littles, the Nuggets struggled losing 13 of their next 16 games as Littles was replaced with General Manager Bernie Bickerstaff. The team was out of playoff position with a 20–26 record at the All-Star break.

Pack would come down with a knee injury in February, as Abdul-Rauf returned to the lineup; Pack would return during the final month of the season in April, but would then re-injure his knee after only playing just 42 games, starting in 32 of them, averaging 12.1 points, 6.9 assists and 1.5 steals per game. Under Bickerstaff, the Nuggets would recover making a late push winning 20 of their final 32 games. On the final day of the regular season, they faced the Sacramento Kings as both teams were fighting for the #8 seed in the Western Conference. The Nuggets would defeat the Kings 102–89 at McNichols Sports Arena to enter the playoffs, finishing fourth in the Midwest Division with a 41–41 record.

Dikembe Mutombo captured his first Defensive Player of the Year award, averaging 11.5 points, 12.5 rebounds and 3.9 blocks per game, and was named to the NBA All-Defensive Second Team, and selected for the 1995 NBA All-Star Game. In addition, Abdul-Rauf led the team in scoring averaging 16.0 points per game, while Reggie Williams provided the team with 13.4 points and 1.5 steals per game, and Rogers contributed 12.2 points and 4.8 rebounds per game. Dale Ellis played a sixth man role, averaging 11.3 points off the bench, while Bryant Stith contributed 11.2 points per game, Rose provided with 8.2 points and 4.8 assists per game, and was named to the NBA All-Rookie Second Team, and Brian Williams averaged 7.9 points and 4.7 rebounds per game off the bench.

However, in the Western Conference First Round of the playoffs, the Nuggets were unable to repeat their previous playoff run, as they were swept by the San Antonio Spurs in three straight games. This would also be the Nuggets' final playoff appearance until 2004. Following the season, Rogers and Williams were both traded to the Los Angeles Clippers, and Pack was dealt to the Washington Bullets.

Draft picks

Roster

Regular season

Season standings

Record vs. opponents

Game log

Regular season

|- align="center" bgcolor="#ffcccc"
| 8
| November 19, 19947:00p.m. MST
| Houston
| L 101–109
| Williams (26)
| Williams (9)
| Abdul-Rauf (5)
| McNichols Sports Arena17,171
| 5–3
|- align="center" bgcolor="#ffcccc"
| 12
| November 29, 19946:30p.m. MST
| @ Houston
| L 81–96
| Rogers (16)
| Mutombo (10)
| Pack, Rogers (4)
| The Summit14,295
| 6–6

|- align="center" bgcolor="#ccffcc"
| 34
| January 14, 19957:00p.m. MST
| Houston
| W 118–104
| Abdul-Rauf (36)
| Williams (10)
| Williams (11)
| McNichols Sports Arena17,171
| 18–16
|- align="center" bgcolor="#ffcccc"
| 42
| January 31, 19956:30p.m. MST
| @ Houston
| L 74–86
| Rogers (23)
| Mutombo (13)
| Rogers (5)
| The Summit14,761
| 19–23

|- align="center"
|colspan="9" bgcolor="#bbcaff"|All-Star Break
|- style="background:#cfc;"
|- bgcolor="#bbffbb"

|- align="center" bgcolor="#ffcccc"
| 74
| April 9, 19951:30p.m. MDT
| Houston
| L 120–123
| Abdul-Rauf (34)
| Mutombo (14)
| Abdul-Rauf (7)
| McNichols Sports Arena17,171
| 35–39

Playoffs

|- align="center" bgcolor="#ffcccc"
| 1
| April 28
| @ San Antonio
| L 88–104
| Bryant Stith (16)
| Bison Dele (12)
| three players tied (3)
| Alamodome25,235
| 0–1
|- align="center" bgcolor="#ffcccc"
| 2
| April 30
| @ San Antonio
| L 96–122
| Mahmoud Abdul-Rauf (21)
| Dale Ellis (10)
| Jalen Rose (10)
| Alamodome
| 0–2
|- align="center" bgcolor="#ffcccc"
| 3
| May 2
| San Antonio
| L 95–99
| Rogers, Stith (18)
| Rodney Rogers (9)
| Jalen Rose (7)
| McNichols Sports Arena17,171
| 0–3
|-

Player statistics

Regular season

Playoffs

Player Statistics Citation:

Awards, records, and honors
 Dikembe Mutombo, NBA Defensive Player of the Year Award
 Dikembe Mutombo, NBA All-Defensive Second Team
 Jalen Rose, NBA All-Rookie Team 2nd Team

Transactions

Free agents

Additions

Subtractions

Trades 
The Denver Nuggets did not make any trades in the off-season and the regular season.

Player Transactions Citation:

References

 Nuggets on Basketball Reference

Denver Nuggets seasons
Denver Nuggets season
Denver Nuggets season
Denver Nug